Nationality words link to articles with information on the nation's poetry or literature (for instance, Irish or France).

Events

Works published

Other
 Sir Richard Fanshawe, translated, Querer por solo querer: To love ony for love sake, translated from Antonio Hurtado de Mendoza
 Fulke Greville, Lord Brooke, The Remains of Sir Fulk Grevill Lord Brooke
 Michael Wigglesworth, Meat Out of the Eater, English Colonial American

Other
 Francisco de Quevedo, Las tres Musas últimas castellanas ("The last three Castilian Muses"), posthumous, edited by the author's nephew, Pedro Alderete

Births
Death years link to the corresponding "[year] in poetry" article:
 January 2 – Thomas Yalden (died 1736), English poet, translator and clergyman
 January 24 – William Congreve (died 1729), English playwright and poet
 November 15 – Bernard Mandeville (died 1733), English philosopher, political economist, poet and satirist
 Kavi Samrat Upendra Bhanja born either 1670 or 1688 (died 1740), Indian poet of Oriya Literature awarded the title Kavi-Samrata - "The Emperor of the Poets"
 Approximate date – Aogán Ó Rathaille (died 1726), Irish poet, creator of the Aisling poem

Deaths
Birth years link to the corresponding "[year] in poetry" article:
 January 21 – Honorat de Bueil, seigneur de Racan (born 1589), French aristocrat, soldier, poet, dramatist and original member of the Académie française
 March 22 – Petru Fudduni (born 1600), Italian poet writing predominantly in Sicilian
 March 31 – Jacob Westerbaen (born 1599), Dutch poet
 Cheng Zhengkui (born 1604), Chinese landscape painter and poet

See also

 Poetry
 17th century in poetry
 17th century in literature
 Restoration literature

Notes

17th-century poetry
Poetry